The CEDEAO Cup was an international men's football tournament for nations in the Economic Community of West African States (ECOWAS; Communauté Economique Des Etats de l'Afrique de l'Ouest, CEDEAO). The tournament was held biannually between 1983 and 1991, and may also have taken place in 1977, but few data are known.

General statistics

Most CEDEAO Cup wins

1983 CEDEAO Cup

Qualifying round

First qualifying round

2–2 on aggregate; Senegal won on penalty shootout.

1–1 on aggregate; Gambia won on penalty shootout.

2–2 on aggregate; Mali won on penalty shootout.

Ghana withdrew; Nigeria advanced.

Second qualifying round

Mali advanced, possibly by away goals rule.

The return round was not played. Togo advanced.

Nigeria advanced.

Final round
The final round was held in Abidjan, Ivory Coast.

Semi-finals

Ivory Coast won on penalties

Third place match

Unknown who won the match

Final

Abandoned at 2–1 in extra time (105').

Replay

1985 CEDEAO Cup

Qualifying round

First round

Second round

Final round
 The final round was played in Senegal. 
 Senegal qualified as hosts, Ivory Coast as holders.

1987 CEDEAO Cup

Preliminary round

Final round
 The final round was held in Monrovia, Liberia.
 Burkina Faso, Liberia and Senegal received byes to final round.

Semi-finals

Third place match

Final

1990 CEDEAO Cup

Qualifying round
The qualifying tournament was held in Liberia.

Final round
 The final round was played in Nigeria.
 Nigeria qualified as hosts, Ivory Coast as holders. Circumstances of Senegal's qualification were unclear.

Semi-finals

Third place match

Final

Some sources record the score as 0–0. Nigeria won on penalty shootout.

1991 CEDEAO Cup
Held in Abidjan, Ivory Coast.

Semi-finals

Third place match

Final

References
details at RSSSF archives

Defunct international association football competitions in Africa
Recurring sporting events established in 1983
Recurring sporting events disestablished in 1991